In measure theory and probability, the monotone class theorem connects monotone classes and -algebras. The theorem says that the smallest monotone class containing an algebra of sets  is precisely the smallest -algebra containing  It is used as a type of transfinite induction to prove many other theorems, such as Fubini's theorem.

Definition of a monotone class

A  is a family (i.e. class)  of sets that is closed under countable monotone unions and also under countable monotone intersections. Explicitly, this means  has the following properties:

 if  and  then  and
 if  and  then

Monotone class theorem for sets

Monotone class theorem for functions

Proof

The following argument originates in Rick Durrett's Probability: Theory and Examples.

Results and applications

As a corollary, if  is a ring of sets of sets, then the smallest monotone class containing it coincides with the -ring of 

By invoking this theorem, one can use monotone classes to help verify that a certain collection of subsets is a -algebra.

The monotone class theorem for functions can be a powerful tool that allows statements about particularly simple classes of functions to be generalized to arbitrary bounded and measurable functions.

See also

Citations

References

  

Families of sets
Theorems in measure theory

fr:Lemme de classe monotone